Bacilos is the first studio album recorded by Bacilos released on May 23, 2000. The album received a Latin Grammy Award nomination for Best Pop Album by a Duo or Group with Vocals.

Track listing
This information adapted from Allmusic.

References

2000 debut albums
Bacilos albums
Spanish-language albums